Thomas Frye Lewis Evans (1845–1920) was a Canadian Anglican priest.

Evans was born in Simcoe, Ontario; and educated at Upper Canada College and Trinity College, Toronto. He was ordained deacon in 1869; and priest in 1870. He was a missionary at Norwich, Ontario from 1869 to 1871; then Curate at Christ Church Cathedral, Montreal from 1871 to 1874. He was Rector of St Stephen, Lachine from 1874 until 1902; and Archdeacon of Montreal from 1886 to 1902. He was Dean of Montreal from 1902.

References

1845 births
Upper Canada College alumni
University of Toronto alumni
Canadian Anglican priests
Deans of Montreal
Archdeacons of Montreal
People from Norfolk County, Ontario
1920 deaths